Little Traverse Wheelway is a rail-to-trail bike path and part of U.S Bicycle Route 35 in the state of Michigan. The Little Traverse Wheelway will eventually connect to the TART Trail, but for now it connects with North Western State Trail at Spring Lake Park.

Points of interest along the trail include:
Little Traverse Bay
Charlevoix
Nature preserves
Downtown Petoskey
Harbor Springs
Petoskey State Park

Trailheads

Notes

References

Rail trails in Michigan